Countess Mariza is a 1932 German musical film directed by Richard Oswald and starring Dorothea Wieck, Hubert Marischka and Charlotte Ander. It is an Operetta film is based on the operetta Countess Maritza by Emmerich Kálmán, Julius Brammer and Alfred Grünwald.

It was shot at the Tempelhof Studios in Berlin. The film's sets were designed by the art director Franz Schroedter.

Cast
 Dorothea Wieck as Gräfin Mariza
 Hubert Marischka as Török, Gutsverwalter
 Charlotte Ander as Lisa
 Ferdinand von Alten as Fürst Popoff
 Anton Pointner as Baron Liebenberg
 Ernő Verebes as Koloman Zsupan
 S.Z. Sakall as Lampe
 Traute Flamme as Ilka
 Mariette Keglevich as Manja
 Edith Karin as Magd

Bibliography

External links

1932 films
1932 musical films
German musical films
Films of the Weimar Republic
1930s German-language films
Films directed by Richard Oswald
Films based on operettas
Operetta films
Films set in Hungary
German black-and-white films
Remakes of German films
Sound film remakes of silent films
Films shot at Tempelhof Studios
1930s German films